The Great Commission is an American Christian hardcore band from Riverside, California. The band started making music in 2007. Their Original membership includes is Justin Singh, Angela Razo, D.J. Burr, Derek C, Matt B, & Chris Ryan. With members Christian, Nelson, Rodney and Solomon joining in as members left. The band released an independently made extended play, The Great Commission, in 2008. They signed to Strike First Records, where they released, And Every Knee Shall Bow, a studio album, in 2009. Their subsequent studio album, Heavy Worship, was released by Ain't No Grave Records, in 2011. The latest recording, Firework, an extended play, was released by Ain't No Grave Recordings, in 2012.

History 
The band commenced as a musical entity in 2007, with their first release, The Great Commission, an extended play, that was released independently in 2008, They signed to Strike First Records, where they released a studio album, And Every Knee Shall Bow, on February 17, 2009. Their subsequent studio album released by Ain't No Grave Records, Heavy Worship, on July 12, 2011. They released, an extended play, Firework, with Ain't No Grave Records, on May 22, 2012.

Cameo 
The band appears as a cameo in Taylor Swift's music video for the song "I Knew You Were Trouble".

Members 
Current members
 Justin Singh – vocals (2007–present)
 Angela Razo Singh – rhythm guitar, vocals (2007–present)
 Christian Ryan – rhythm guitar
 Robby Joyner – lead guitar

Former members
 D.J. Burr – lead guitar (2007–2009)
 Solomon Joy – guitar, drums
 Zachary Cohen – drums (2012–2013)
 Victor Cota – guitar, vocals
 Billy Sweet – guitar
 Alonso Azofeifa – drums
 Rodney – drums
 Derek – bass
 Nelson Flores – lead guitar (2009–2011) (ex-Sovereign Strength, Mychildren Mybride)
 Josh Loza – bass
 Corey White – guitar
 Steven "Sven" Webb – drums

Discography
Studio albums
 And Every Knee Shall Bow (February 17, 2009, Strike First)
 Heavy Worship (July 12, 2011, Ain't No Grave)

EPs
 Firework (May 8, 2012, Ain't No Grave)

References

External links 
 Facebook page

Musical groups from California
2007 establishments in California
Musical groups established in 2007
Facedown Records artists
Strike First Records artists
American deathcore musical groups
Metalcore musical groups from California